SpaceTime (also known as SpaceTime3D) is a 3D graphical user interface that displays web pages in a 3d tabbed stack. The interface is available as online as a flash application, or as a free desktop software download for the Microsoft Windows operating system.

The technology was presented at the 2008 CES tradeshow.

History

CEO Eddie Bakhash began working on SpaceTime in 1993. The product debuted in beta on June 4, 2007. On the day of the release, the San Jose Mercury News noted that the software was "the most advanced 3-D navigation system I've seen. It doesn't make me dizzy, except with the thoughts of what this could become."

The software's capabilities have been compared to other current browsing and 3D technologies such as in  TechCrunch's comment that SpaceTime is "pure eye candy, sort of like Second Life meets Firefox."

SpaceTime online search
The online version of SpaceTime features the ability to search Google, Google Images, Wikipedia, and YouTube.

SpaceTime Browser

The desktop application was released in beta form on June 4, 2007 and is currently available for Windows 2000, XP, and Vista systems. A Mac OS X version was planned for 2008, but has yet to come to fruition. SpaceTime developers are currently working to port the product to the OpenGL framework in order to support the Linux and Unix operating systems.

When using search engines including Google, Google Images, Yahoo!, Yahoo! Image, eBay, and Flickr, SpaceTime loads the first ten results as a stack of pages.

Reception
The beta browser received mixed reviews. Katherine Boehret of The Wall Street Journal stated that "though I’ll still rely on Google for basic searches, visual search can save time and turn searching into a fun process." Jack M. Germain, of TechNewsWorld described how "SpaceTime delivers on its promise to save me time and provide a revolutionary online searching too" stating that "while I continue to use the 3-D searching environment, though, I am having more fun than I should at work." Edward N. Albro of PCWorld gave the beta browser a 2.5/5 stating that while its "visual results can make searches easier", that "for basic browsing, SpaceTime has no appeal" and that the browser was too "buggy and slow for basic browsing".

See also
 SearchMe
 AT&T Pogo
 Cooliris

Notes

References

External links
 SpaceTime Online Visual Search 
 SpaceTime Windows Download
 SpaceTime3D HomePage
 SpaceTime3D Blog
 SpaceTime Facebook
 SpaceTime3d Myspace

Web browsers
Windows Internet software
Windows web browsers
Discontinued web browsers